Gadhinglaj High School is a school and Junior college in Gadhinglaj, Kolhapur district, State Maharashtra, India. This school is on Kalbhairi (God of Gadhinglaj Village) Road. This school is run by "Shri Swami Vivekanand Shikshan Sanstha".

The high school has education available from 1st standard to 10th standard. It also has a Junior college stream which has 11th and 12th standards of Science Stream. The school has a playground inside the campus.

The curriculum for the school and college is designed based on syllabus decided by Maharashtra State Board of Secondary and Higher Secondary Education. The principal of this school is Gajanan Irappa Chavan at present.

See also 
Gadhinglaj
Maharashtra State Board of Secondary and Higher Secondary Education

High schools and secondary schools in Maharashtra
Kolhapur district